Jan Muhammed A Memon, a medical professional. He was born on 1 May 1949 and obtained primary and secondary schooling in Tando Muhammad Khan, followed by MBBS at then Liaquat Medical College (LMC), with distinction in Surgery. He then pursued FRCS at the Royal College of Surgeons UK. He returned to Pakistan in 1979 and joined LMC as Assistant Professor of Surgery.

Memon was the founder Vice Chancellor of Liaquat University of Medical & Health Sciences (LUMHS) Pakistan.

Brief Career History 

 Founder and Principal, Indus Medical College, Tando Muhammad Khan.
 Secretary CPSP, Registrar CPSP and Advisor Academics - Between 2009 and 2011
 Founder Vice Chancellor LUMHS - 2001 to 2007
 Principal & Chairman Academic Council LMC - 1996 to 2001
 Dean Faculty of Medicine & Health Sciences, Sindh University - 1996 to 2001
 Professor of Surgery - From 1979 to 2009
 Registrar and Senior Resident at various UK hospitals - 1973 to 1979

Achievements 

Some of his contributions as cited in newspapers include:

 Dawn - July 2005 - http://archives.dawn.com/weekly/dmag/archive/050710/dmag9.htm
 The News - Jan 2007 - http://jang.com.pk/thenews/jan2007-weekly/education-12-01-2007/index.html#2
 Dawn - Oct 2006 - http://archives.dawn.com/2006/10/18/local27.htm
 Dawn - Aug 2006 - http://archives.dawn.com/2006/08/10/local24.htm

References 
<http://archives.dawn.com/weekly/dmag/archive/050710/dmag9.htm>

</http://jang.com.pk/thenews/jan2007-weekly/education-12-01-2007/index.html#2>

1949 births
Living people
Pakistani surgeons
People from Sindh
Sindhi people